John Harvey Tolan (January 15, 1877 – June 30, 1947) was an American lawyer and politician who served six terms as a U.S. Representative from California from 1935 to 1947.

Biography 
Born in St. Peter, Minnesota, Tolan attended the public schools.
He moved to Anaconda, Montana, in 1897.
He was graduated from the law department of the University of Kansas at Lawrence in 1902.
He was admitted to the bar the same year and commenced the practice of law in Anaconda, Montana and served as attorney of Deer Lodge County, Montana from 1904 to 1906. He moved to Oakland, California, in 1914 and continued the practice of law.

Congress 
Tolan was elected as a Democrat to the Seventy-fourth and to the five succeeding Congresses (January 3, 1935 – January 3, 1947).
He was not a candidate for renomination in 1946 to the Eightieth Congress.

Death
He died in Westwood, California, on June 30, 1947.
He was interred at Holy Sepulchre Cemetery, Hayward, California.

Notes

References

External links

John Harvey Tolan photograph collection, The Bancroft Library

1877 births
1947 deaths
19th-century Roman Catholics
20th-century Roman Catholics
Burials in Alameda County, California
Catholics from Minnesota
Catholics from Montana
Democratic Party members of the United States House of Representatives from California
Montana lawyers
People from Anaconda, Montana
People from St. Peter, Minnesota
University of Kansas School of Law alumni